Cerotoma ruficornis is a species of leaf beetle in the family Chrysomelidae. It is found in the Caribbean Sea, Central America, and North America.

Subspecies
These two subspecies belong to the species Cerotoma ruficornis:
 Cerotoma ruficornis ruficornis (Olivier, 1791)
 Cerotoma ruficornis sexpunctata (Horn, 1872)

References

Further reading

 

Galerucinae
Articles created by Qbugbot
Beetles described in 1791
Taxa named by Guillaume-Antoine Olivier